Frank Helmick is a retired United States Army lieutenant general. He is the former commanding general of the XVIII Airborne Corps. From February to December 2011, he additionally served as the deputy commanding general for operations, United States Forces – Iraq.  Prior to assuming command of the XVIII Airborne Corps, LTG Helmick commanded the Multi-National Security Transition Command - Iraq along with the NATO Training Mission-Iraq from July 3, 2008 to October 7, 2009.

Helmick has held numerous command and senior staff positions.  He has commanded and served in many units in both operational and training commands:  Commander 3rd Battalion, 504th Parachute Infantry Regiment, 82nd Airborne Division, Fort Bragg, North Carolina; Commander Ranger Training Brigade, Fort Benning, Georgia; Assistant Division Commander 101st Airborne Division (Air Assault), Fort Campbell, Kentucky; Commander of the Southern European Task Force (Airborne), Vicenza, Italy.

His staff assignments include service in the 82nd Airborne Division, the Joint Staff, and the Office of the Secretary of Defense where he served as the Senior Military Advisor to the Deputy Secretary of Defense.

Career

Iraq War
Helmick was the commander who led the attack in Mosul that killed Uday and Qusay Hussein, Saddam Hussein's sons.

On August 24, 2008 Helmick survived a suicide bombing of the MRAP vehicle he was riding in near Forward Operating Base Marez in Mosul.  The suicide car bomb attack killed the attacker and damaged the International MaxxPro Plus vehicle, but Helmick, Brigadier General Raymond "Tony" Thomas, an Iraqi general and others inside the vehicle were not seriously injured.

Personal life
Helmick has attended a variety of military schools including the United States Military Academy, Infantry Officer Basic Course, the Armor Officer Advanced Course, the Naval Postgraduate School, the United States Armed Forces Staff Course at the Armed Forces Staff College, and the United States Army War College.

Awards and decorations

Assignments

Effective dates of promotion

See also
Helmick's official Facebook page

References

1953 births
Living people
United States Army generals
United States Army personnel of the Iraq War
Recipients of the Legion of Merit
Recipients of the Distinguished Service Medal (US Army)
Recipients of the Defense Superior Service Medal
Recipients of the Defense Distinguished Service Medal